Alan Paul Novak is a Pennsylvania attorney and former chairman of the Republican State Committee of Pennsylvania, a position he held from 1996 to 2004. During his tenure, he became known for his skill with statewide judicial elections.

As at attorney with Conrad O'Brien PC, he practices business and municipal law, zoning, real estate transactions, business and corporate formation, and government relations.

Prior to working as chair of the Republican State Committee of Pennsylvania, he was chair of the Chester County Republican party.

He was named to the 2002 and 2003 PoliticsPA "Sy Snyder's Power 50" of influential people in Pennsylvania politics. 
  In 2010, Politics Magazine named him one of the most influential Republicans in Pennsylvania.

An alumnus of Ursinus College, he has served as the Chair of the college's Board of Trustees since 2012.

References

External links

Living people
Pennsylvania Republicans
Chairs of the Republican State Committee of Pennsylvania
Ursinus College alumni
Year of birth missing (living people)

Pennsylvania lawyers
Villanova University School of Law alumni
1949 births